Lorenz Gösta Beutin (born 18 July 1978) is a German politician who he represents The Left. He served as a member of the Bundestag from the state of Schleswig-Holstein from 2017 to 2021.

Life 
Beutin was born in Hamburg. In 1998 and 1999 he did his civilian service at the Protestant Academy Bad Segeberg. Since the 1999–2000 winter semester Beutin studied history, politics and German language and literature at the University of Hamburg. He completed it in 2008 with a master's thesis. As a historian he works on the history of National Socialism and anti-Semitism. He became member of the bundestag after the 2017 German federal election. He is a member of the Committee for Economics and Energy. He is spokesman for his parliamentary group on energy and climate policy.

References

External links 

  
 Bundestag biography 

1978 births
Living people
Members of the Bundestag for Schleswig-Holstein
Members of the Bundestag 2017–2021
Members of the Bundestag for The Left